Rik Schaffer is an American composer and musician. He formed Womb Music in 1996 after being in the music industry as a member of several acts such as Tomorrow's Child and Engines of Aggression. He often works with his partner Margaret Tang.

Rik has also composed original soundtracks for video games, gaining recognition particularly for his work on Vampire: The Masquerade – Bloodlines.

Discography

Studio albums
Tomorrow's Child (glam rock band active between 1988-1996, lead guitarist)

Tomorrow's Child (Dream Circle, 1993)
Rocky Coast, Rough Sea (Dream Circle, 1996)

Engines of Aggression (industrial metal band active between 1993-2001, lead guitarist)

Speak EP (Priority, 1993)
Illusion Is Real single (Priority, 1993)
Inhuman Nature (Priority, 1994)
Engines of Aggression EP (self-released, 2001)

Womb (solo grunge project, vocals by Todd Miller except for As Lonely As I Am done by Jamie Alexander)
Bella (Dream Circle, 1996)

Instrumental versions of Clean, Selfless Doubt and As Lonely As I Am (retitled Poinsettia) are present on the soundtrack of Vampire: The Masquerade - Bloodlines

Nectar (solo prog rock project, vocals by Stephen Shareaux of Kik Tracee except for We Just Disagree done by Dean Ortega)

Afterglow (Dream Circle, 1997)

An instrumental version of We Just Disagree (retitled as All That Could Ever Be) is present on the soundtrack of Vampire: The Masquerade - Bloodlines

The last track Black Sheep is misspelled as "Back Sheep." on the cd jewel case

Video game original scores
Dark Age Of Camelot (multi-artists soundtrack, 2001 and following expansions)
Bruce Lee: Quest of the Dragon (2002)
The Scorpion King: Rise of the Akkadian (2002)
Spawn: Armageddon (2003)
X-Men Legends (2004)
Vampire: The Masquerade – Bloodlines (2004)
Fantastic Four (2005)
X-Men: The Official Game (2006)
The Shield: The Game (2007)
Neverwinter Nights 2: Mask of the Betrayer (2007)
The Elder Scrolls Online (multi-artists soundtrack, 2014, Volume 1 and Volume 2 albums released in 2016 and 2017 respectively).
Vampire: The Masquerade – Bloodlines 2 (TBA)

References

External links
Womb Music
 
 

American film score composers
American male film score composers
Video game musicians
Living people
Year of birth missing (living people)